Élise Guilbault (born April 8, 1961) is a Canadian film and television actress. She won the Genie Award for Best Actress for her role in the film The Woman Who Drinks (La Femme qui boit), and was a nominee for Cap Tourmente. She also starred in several later films by The Woman Who Drinks director Bernard Émond, also appearing in The Novena (La Neuvaine), The Legacy (La Donation) and A Place to Live (Pour vivre ici).

Her television roles have included Les Hauts et les bas de Sophie Paquin, Le Coeur a ses raisons, Annie et ses hommes, Un gars, une fille and René Lévesque and La Faille (2019).

References

External links 
 

1961 births
Canadian film actresses
Canadian television actresses
Best Actress Genie and Canadian Screen Award winners
French Quebecers
Living people
Actresses from Quebec
Place of birth missing (living people)
Canadian stage actresses
Best Actress Jutra and Iris Award winners
20th-century Canadian actresses
21st-century Canadian actresses